The fifth USS Alabama was a section patrol craft in the United States Navy, but probably never saw active naval service.

Alabama was a 69-foot motor boat built in 1906 at South Boston, Massachusetts, by George Lawley and Sons.  She was inspected by the Navy in the summer of 1917. Records indicate that on 25 July 1917 the Navy concluded an agreement with her owners, the American and British Manufacturing Co., Bridgeport, Connecticut, for possible future acquisition of the boat. By the terms of that agreement, Alabama — assigned the designation SP-1052 —- was "enrolled in the Naval Coast Defense Reserve." All indications are, however, that Alabama never saw actual naval service, possibly remaining "enrolled" in a reserve capacity, since she does not appear on contemporary lists of commandeered, chartered, or leased small craft actually used by the Navy during World War I.

External links 
USS Alabama (SP-1052) DANFS Page

Patrol vessels of the United States Navy
Ships built in Boston
World War I patrol vessels of the United States
1906 ships